Reykjanestá is the uttermost tip of Reykjanes Peninsula (Reykjanesskagi) in Iceland. It is situated on a small peninsula called Reykjanes which in itself again is part of the big peninsula Reykjanesskagi.

Road 425 and some smaller roads lead to it.

It is there that the Reykjanes Ridge is connected to Reykjanes Peninsula (see: Geology of Reykjanes Peninsula). Today the area is situated within the westernmost volcanic system, Reykjanes volcanic zone (RVZ).

Landforms
Characteristic landforms of Reykjanestá are e.g. eroded and partially submarine volcanoes. The cliff of Valahnúkur  as well as the stack Karl  are their remains. They are popular bird cliffs with nests of European herring gulls (larus argentatus), Northern fulmars (fulmarus glacialis), black-legged kittiwakes (rissa tridactyla) and ravens (corvus corax). On the eastern side of Valahnúkar, there are impressive boulder beaches.

Sometimes also the Stampar  crater rows from eruptions during the 13th century within the Reykjanes Volcanic System are counted in as well as the high temperature area around the mud resp. hot water geysers of Gunnuhver . In this area a geothermal power station called Reykjanes Power Station has been installed in 2006 and produces 100 MW.

Island Eldey
From the cliffs and beach at Reykjanestá, the island of Eldey can be seen. The distance to Reykjanestá is 14 km, the height of the rocky island 77m.

It is known to be especially popular with morus bassanus as a breeding place in the North Atlantic.

On the other hand, the Eldey Volcanic System, which is for the most part submarine, is today mostly seen as independent from Reykjanes Volcanic System. It is part of Reykjanes Ridge.

Lighthouse Reykjanesviti
In 1878, the first Icelandic lighthouse was erected near Valahnúkur. It had become necessary as the most used shipping lane next to Iceland passed by this point and the sea can be dangerous here. The 14 km broad strait between the peninsula and the island of Eldey is often used by ships and at the same time heavy currents accompany the tides in both directions so that the area had a bad reputation which many shipwrecks confirm. In 1887, the hill were it stood, was eroded by earthquake action, so that the old lighthouse had to be taken down. The next lighthouse could not be constructed before 1908 and was then built up on the hill of Vatnafell  at about 1 km from the coast line where it stands till today  in 73 m msl.

Motion pictures in a picturesque scenery
Two known films were produced in this landscape: Prince of Darkness (Myrkrahöfðinginn), a film by the Icelandic director Hrafn Gunnlaugsson, in 2000, near the lighthouse, and Flags of Our Fathers by Clint Eastwood about 10 km away in and around the bays Litla-Sandvík  and Stóra-Sandvík  in 2006.

See also
 Geology of Reykjanes Peninsula

References

External links
  Visit Reykjanes, Official Website

Tourist attractions in Iceland
Reykjanes
Bird cliffs of Iceland